The Dubai National Industries Park (NIP), formerly known as Dubai Techno Park (DTP), is an industrial park in Dubai, United Arab Emirates. It is a UAE mainland zone and was established in 2002. It is part of DP World UAE and covers 21 square kilometres.

National Industries Park, a part of DP World UAE, was started as a specific industrial leaseable land zone in 2003. National Industries Park is ideally situated within the logistics and industrial sector of Dubai. Its close proximity to the port of Jebel Ali, being part of the Logistics Corridor, easy access to Al Maktoum International Airport, and access to the national highways make it the perfect location.

See also
 List of development projects in Dubai
 List of Industrial areas in Dubai
 Developments in Dubai
 Dubai Industrial Park

References

External links
NIP website 
DP World Website

2002 establishments in the United Arab Emirates
Industrial parks in the United Arab Emirates
Information technology in the United Arab Emirates
Free-trade zones of the United Arab Emirates
Buildings and structures in Dubai
Economy of Dubai
Geography of Dubai